The Rome refinery was built in 1965 at Pantano di Grano, south-west of Rome, approximately 10 km from the coast, near the port of Fiumicino.
On July 12, 2005 Shell sold its 20% stake to Total which now owns 77.5% of the company.
The remaining part is owned by ERG which owns entirely or partly other 3 refineries in Italy.

It has a processing capacity of 4.3 Mt/a, is equipped with a visbreaking plant of around 1.7 Mt/a and  a plant for the production of bitumen. 
It has a sea terminal to receive raw materials and dispense with surplus products.
The Rome refinery is also an important logistical base: a certain amount of products, equal to 50% of refinery production, arrives from the outside, using the structure as a transit depot.

Oil refineries in Italy